The 2014 SEC softball tournament was May 7 through 10th at Carolina Softball stadium in Columbia, South Carolina. Georgia ended up winning their first SEC softball tournament title over Kentucky.

Tournament

 Arkansas, Ole Miss, and Texas A&M did not make the tournament. Vanderbilt does not sponsor a softball team.

SEC softball tournament
Tournament